Aya Jeddi (born 13 August 1999) is a Tunisian footballer who plays as a left winger for AF Sousse and the Tunisia women's national team.

Club career
Jeddi has played for Sousse in Tunisia.

International career
Jeddi has capped for Tunisia at senior level, including two friendly away wins over Jordan in June 2021.

International goals
Scores and results list Tunisia's goal tally first

See also
List of Tunisia women's international footballers

References

External links

1999 births
Living people
Tunisian women's footballers
Women's association football wingers
Tunisia women's international footballers
20th-century Tunisian women
21st-century Tunisian women
Saudi Women's Premier League players